Chanel Solitaire is a 1981 British-French-American historical drama film directed by George Kaczender and starring Marie-France Pisier, Timothy Dalton, Rutger Hauer, Brigitte Fossey, Karen Black, Lambert Wilson. The film's subject was Coco Chanel. Its budget was around £7 million. The film was based on the novel of the same title by Claude Delay. It was shot at the Billancourt Studios and location shooting in Deauville and Le Meux. The film's sets were designed by the art director Jacques Saulnier.

Cast 
 Marie-France Pisier as Coco Chanel
 Timothy Dalton as Boy Capel
 Rutger Hauer as Étienne Balsan
 Karen Black as Émilienne d'Alençon
 Brigitte Fossey as Adrienne
 Leila Fréchet as Young Coco Chanel
 Philippe Nicaud as 	Gabrielle's Father
 Alexandra Stewart as Nathalie
 Catherine Allégret as 	Gabrielle's Friend
 Hélène Vallier as Aunt Louise
 Jean-Marie Proslier as Poiret
 Nicole Maurey as 	Grande Dame
 Humbert Balsanas 	Robert
 Catherine Alcover as 	Lady
 Albert Augier as 	Headwaiter
 Corine Blue as 	Young Woman
 Lyne Chardonnet as 	Young Nun
 Yvonne Dany as 	Woman I
 Isabelle Duby as 	Leon's Girlfriend
 Huguette Faget as Woman II
 Louise Vincent as 	Matron
 David Gabison as Priest
 Louba Guertchikoff as 	Woman III
 Philippe Mareuil as 	Supervisor
Jean-Gabriel Nordmann as 	Boy's Secretary
 Lionel Rocheman as 	Tailor
 Violetta Sanchez as 	Blandine
 Jimmy Shuman as 	Voice at La Rotonde
 Jean Valmont as Fat Man
 Sylvia Zerbib as 	Young Maid

References

Bibliography
 Brown, Tom & Vidal, Belén. The Biopic in Contemporary Film Culture. Routledge, 2013.
 Goble, Alan. The Complete Index to Literary Sources in Film. Walter de Gruyter, 1999.

External links

1981 films
1980s biographical drama films
1980s historical films
1981 LGBT-related films
1981 romantic drama films
American LGBT-related films
British biographical drama films
British historical films
British LGBT-related films
British romantic drama films
French biographical drama films
French historical films
French LGBT-related films
French romantic drama films
English-language French films
Films directed by George Kaczender
Films about fashion designers
Films set in the 1900s
Films set in the 1910s
Films set in the 1920s
Cultural depictions of Coco Chanel
British historical romance films
Films shot at Billancourt Studios
1980s English-language films
1980s American films
1980s British films
1980s French films